Teni is a railway station on Madurai–Bodinayakkanur branch line, serving the town of Theni in Tamil Nadu state, India. It was closed, as the line is under gauge conversion, from metre to broad gauge until 30 March 2022. From 31 March 2022 once again this station becomes operational after CRS inspection is successfully conducted between Andipatti to Theni railway station. It is one of the railway stations in Southern Railway zone. It falls under Madurai Division of the Indian Railways.

It is one of the rare railway stations in India where all the historic Indian gauges 610mm, 762mm, 1000mm are used. Currently it is being converted to 1676mm broad gauge.

Lines 
This is a  railway station of Madurai–Bodinayakanur line. Currently it is under gauge conversion from metre gauge to broad gauge. The metre-gauge tracks have already been removed.

History 
Theni railway station was inaugurated on 1909 as a light railway line (610mm), later that line was closed due to World War I in 1915. Later Teni railway station was inaugurated together with the Madurai–Bodinayakanur 90 km branch line on 20 November 1928 as narrow-gauge railway (762mm) by the Madras Provincial revenue member Norman Marjoribanks. Later in 1942, during the Second World War, the line was closed and the tracks were removed. After India's Independence, between 1953 and 1954, the track was restored as a metre-gauge railway.

The Madurai–Bodinayakanur line was sanctioned for gauge conversion, from metre-gauge (1,000 mm (3 ft 3 3⁄8 in)) to broad gauge (1,676 mm (5 ft 6 in)). It was closed on 1 January 2011, expecting to reopen it by 2012, but due to lack of funds, the project advanced at very slow pace. The remaining 53 km Usilampatti–Bodinayakanur section is expected to reopen in April 2020. In December 2020 Usilambatti to Andipatti section of the railway line got materialised and was inaugurated, after passing the inspection of the Commission of Railway Safety.

During 1909 a narrow-gauge railway line existed between Dindigul Junction to Kumily Lower Camp via Sempatti, Batlagundu, Periyakulam, Theni, Cumbum. It had several branch lines in-between Periyakulam to Kodaikanal foothills and theni to Kottagudi. Near Kottagudi, the Kundala Valley Railway line's Topslip railway station is present at a distance of 5 km. This railway line had been closed due to World War I as well as due to poor patronage.

The current railway line alignment between theni railway station to Bodinayakanur railway station follows the same alignment of the old railway line which existed during 1910 between Theni to Kottagudi branch railway line. The new railway line is constructed from Theni to  later in 1928 as Madurai-Bodinayakanur Branch Line, now this line is exist and is currently under Gauge conversion from metre gauge to broad gauge.

Trains

References 

Railway stations in Theni district